Yngve is a Scandinavian male given name, mostly used in Sweden and Norway. It is the modern form of either Old Norse  Yngvi or of Ingwin.
Yngvi was the Old Norse name of the Germanic god Ingu-, later identified with Freyr, or of Ingwian- "belonging to the tribe of the Ingvaeones" (who were in turn named after Ingu-.

The name is most common among Swedish men over the age of 50, and occurs almost exclusively as a middle name among the youngest. Due to its Viking origins, the name was very popular during the 19th century and the national romantic era. 

As of 31 December 2005, there are a total of 18,578 Swedes with the name, of which 4756 use it as their main first name. As of 1 January 2006 there are 2370 Norwegians with Yngve as their first name, 1924 of whom use it as their only first name. In Finland there are 1046 people named Yngve.

Its namesday in the Swedish name day list of 2001 is 11 February.

People named Yngve
Given name
Yngve Brilioth (1891–1959), former Archbishop of Uppsala
Yngve Brodd (1930–2016), Swedish football player
Yngve Ekstrand (1888–1951), Swedish Navy rear admiral
Yngve Ekström (1913–1988), Swedish furniture designer
Yngve Engkvist (1918–1982), Swedish Olympic sailor
Yngve Gamlin (1926–1995), Swedish actor and film director
Yngve Häckner (1895–1987), Swedish javelin thrower and politician
Yngve Hågensen (born 1938), Norwegian political consultant
Yngve Hallén (born 1968), president of the Norwegian Football Association
Yngve Holm (1895–1943), Swedish sailor
Yngve Holmberg (1925–2011), Swedish politician
Yngve Johansson, Swedish former footballer
Yngve Johnson (1895–1949), Swedish diver
Yngve Kalin (born 1950), Swedish priest in Hyssna
Yngve A. A. Larsson (1917–2014), Swedish pediatrician
Yngve Larsson (born 1881), Swedish politician
Yngve Lindgren (1912–1990), Swedish footballer
Yngve Lindqvist (1897–1937), Swedish sport sailor
Yngve Lundh (1924–2017), Swedish cyclist
Yngve Eilert Määttä (1935–2011), Swedish ice hockey player and coach
Yngwie Malmsteen (born  Lars Johan Yngve Lannerbäck in 1963), Swedish guitarist
Yngve Moe (1957–2013), Norwegian bass guitarist
Yngve Nordwall (1908–1994), Swedish film actor and director
Per Yngve Ohlin (1969–1991), Lead singer of the black Metal band, Mayhem
Sven Yngve Persson (born 1960), Swedish politician
Bror Yngve Rahm (born 1955), Norwegian politician
Yngve Rosqvist, Swedish footballer
Yngve Sætre (born 1962), Norwegian record producer, musician
Bror Yngve Sjöstedt (1866–1948), Swedish naturalist
Yngve Sköld (1899–1992), Swedish composer and pianist
Yngve Slettholm (born 1955), Norwegian politician and Salvationist
Yngve Slyngstad (born 1962), CEO of Norges Bank Investment Management
Yngve Edward Soderberg (1896–1972), American artist in Mystic, Connecticut
Yngve Stiernspetz (1887–1945), Swedish gymnast
Yngve Viebke (1912–1988), Olympic horse rider
Sindre Yngve Walstad, Norwegian handball player
Nils Yngve Wessell (1914–2007), American psychologist, president of Tufts University
Yngve Wieland (born 1983), German singer-songwriter and musician
Yngve Zotterman (1898–1982), Swedish neurophysiologist

Surname
 Victor Yngve (1920–2012), American computational linguist

See also
Murder of Yngve Raustein (1970–1992)
The Man Who Loved Yngve, Norwegian film (2008)

References

Norwegian masculine given names
Swedish masculine given names